is a grouping of twenty-four Ainu chashi on the Nemuro Peninsula in Nemuro, Hokkaidō, Japan that have been jointly designated a national Historic Site, out of a total of thirty-two chashi sites identified in the city. The grouping is also the first entry on the Japan Castle Foundation's 2006 list of Japan's Top 100 Castles. Relative to many of those elsewhere on the island, their state of preservation is good. They are thought to date from the sixteenth to the eighteenth centuries, and are associated with the 1789 Menashi–Kunashir rebellion.

See also
 List of Historic Sites of Japan (Hokkaidō)
 List of Cultural Properties of Japan - archaeological materials (Hokkaidō)
 Katsuragaoka Chashi
 Yukuepira Chashi
 Moshiriya Chashi

References

History of Hokkaido
Nemuro, Hokkaido
Archaeological sites in Japan
Chashi